Bamaoxi Township is an rural township in Sangzhi County, Zhangjiajie, Hunan Province, China.

Administrative division
The township is divided into 10 villages, the following areas: Nanmuping Village, Bamaoxi Village, Huangliantai Village, Miluohu Village, Liaozhuwan Village, Sangzhiping Village, Quheping Village, Shilipo Village, Yangjiawan Village, and Shuitianba Village (楠木坪村、黄连台村、芭茅溪村、汨落湖村、辽竹湾村、桑植坪村、取和平村、十里坡村、杨家湾村、水田坝村).

References

External links

Former towns and townships of Sangzhi County